Nautilus is an upcoming British adventure drama television series created by James Dormer for Disney+. The series will consist of ten episodes.

Cast and characters 

 Shazad Latif as Captain Nemo
 Georgia Flood as Humility Lucas
 Thierry Frémont as Gustave Benoit
 Pacharo Mzembe as Boniface
 Arlo Green as Turan
 Tyrone Ngatai as Kai
 Ling Cooper Tang as Suyin
 Andrew Shaw as Jiacomo
 Ashan Kumar as Ranbir
 Chum Ehelepola as Jagadish
 Céline Menville as Loti
 Kayden Price as Blaster
 Damien Garvey as Director Crawley
 Richard E. Grant as the leader of Karajaan
 Muki Zubis as Casamir
 Benedict Hardie as Cuff
 Jacob Collins-Levy as Captain Youngblood
 Luke Arnold as Captain Billy Millais

Production

Development 
In August 2021, it was announced that Disney+ had ordered Nautilus, a ten-part television series about the origin of Captain Nemo and his submarine, the Nautilus. James Dormer writes the series, and also serves as executive producer with Xavier Marchand, Anand Tucker and Johanna Devereaux. Moonriver TV and Seven Stories produce the series. Michael Matthews joined as director in November 2021. Cameron Welsh joined as series producer and Chris Loveall joined as executive producer in February 2022.

Casting 
Shazad Latif was cast as Captain Nemo in November 2021. In February 2022, Georgia Flood, Thierry Frémont, Pacharo Mzembe, Arlo Green, Tyrone Ngatai, Ling Cooper Tang, Andrew Shaw, Ashan Kumar, Chum Ehelepola, Céline Menville, Kayden Price, and Damien Garvey were cast. In May 2022, Richard E. Grant joined the cast as a guest star. Muki Zubis, Benedict Hardie, Jacob Collins-Levy, and Luke Arnold also joined the cast.

Filming 
Filming began in mid-February 2022 at Village Roadshow Studios in Gold Coast, Queensland. The series is expected to wrap in January 2023. The series filmed at The Old Museum in Brisbane in May 2022, and at the Queensland Parliament House in September. Filming was previously set to begin in December 2021.

References

External links 
 

Upcoming drama television series
Disney+ original programming
Television series by All3Media
Television shows filmed in Australia
2023 British television series debuts
British adventure television series
2020s British drama television series
Television shows based on Twenty Thousand Leagues Under the Sea
English-language television shows